This is a list of Claude Kelly's songwriting and production credits.

Songwriting

Discography

References

External links
 

Production discographies
Pop music discographies
Rhythm and blues discographies
Discographies of American artists